Ronald Harold Barrett (born 22 July 1939) is an English former professional footballer who played as a forward.

References

1939 births
Living people
sportspeople from Reading, Berkshire
English footballers
Association football forwards
Maidenhead United F.C. players
Grimsby Town F.C. players
Poole Town F.C. players
English Football League players